Notcutt v Universal Equipment Co (London) Ltd [1986] ICR 414 is an English contract law and UK labour law case, concerning the frustration of an agreement.

Facts
Mr Notcutt had a heart attack. The doctor said it was unlikely he would ever work again. His employers gave the statutory 12-week notice to terminate his contract, but made no payment of wages on the ground that the employee was not entitled to sick pay. Mr Notcutt sued under Employment Protection (Consolidation) Act 1978 section 88(1)(b) which says that normal wages must be paid in the period of notice if an employee is incapable of work due to sickness. Then the employer argued the contract was frustrated.

Judgment
Dillon LJ held the contract was frustrated. He referred to Hare v Murphy Brothers Ltd where Lord Denning MR held a contract was frustrated when a man was sentenced to 12 months prison, on a supposed analogy with someone that was grievously injured an incapacitated in a road accident.

See also

English contract law
Frustration in English law
Igbo v Johnson, Matthey Chemicals Ltd [1986] ICR 505

Notes

References

United Kingdom labour case law
English contract case law
Court of Appeal (England and Wales) cases
1986 in case law
1986 in British law